Boris Epure (1882 in Chișinău, Russian Empire – December 12, 1938 in Chișinău, Kingdom of Romania) was a Bessarabian politician. He served as Member of the Moldovan Parliament (1917–1918).

Gallery

Bibliography 
Gheorghe E. Cojocaru, Sfatul Țării: itinerar, Civitas, Chişinău, 1998, 
Mihai Taşcă, Sfatul Țării şi actualele autorităţi locale, "Timpul de dimineaţă", no. 114 (849), June 27, 2008 (page 16)

External links 
 Arhiva pentru Sfatul Tarii
 Deputaţii Sfatului Ţării şi Lavrenti Beria

Notes

1882 births
1938 deaths
Politicians from Chișinău
People from Kishinyovsky Uyezd
Moldovan MPs 1917–1918